Sorry for Party Rocking is the second and final studio album by LMFAO. It was released June 21, 2011, physically and digitally by Interscope Records as the follow-up to their debut album Party Rock (2009).  "Party Rock Anthem" was the first single released from the album and was an international hit. The second single was "Champagne Showers" and reached number eight in New Zealand, and nine in Australia. It became an international hit, also charting in France, Ireland, and Austria. The third single, "Sexy and I Know It" was released on September 16, 2011. It peaked at number one on the US Billboard Hot 100 and also topped the charts in Australia, Canada, and New Zealand. "Sorry for Party Rocking" was released on January 9, 2012, as the fourth single from the album and peaked at number 8 in Belgium, 16 in France, 18 in Ireland, 19 on the US Pop Songs, 23 in the United Kingdom, 27 in New Zealand, 31 in Canada, 32 in Australia, and 49 on the Billboard Hot 100.

Release dates 
The album was released first in New Zealand on June 17, 2011, followed by a UK release on July 18, 2011.

Critical reception 

Sorry for Party Rocking has received mixed reviews from music critics. The album currently holds a score of 47 out of 100 on Metacritic, based on 13 reviews, indicating "mixed or average reviews". Josh Bush from AllMusic gave it a favorable review, awarding it three and a half out of five stars. He said "Their second album, Sorry for Party Rocking, arrives at exactly the right time and includes exactly the right mix of energy and humor, plus a surprising amount of sincerity." They highlighted "Sorry for Party Rocking", "Party Rock Anthem" and "Champagne Showers".

Billboard had said prior to the promotion "LMFAO is, of course, not "Sorry for Party Rocking." But the dance duo's sophomore album is "more refined" and more experimental than its 2009 debut, "Party Rock."

British music journal NME were particularly scathing, giving it a score of 0 out of 10.  Criticizing the album, Sam Wolfson wrote "... it's not the persistent and aggressive misogyny that is the most soul-destroying thing about the record. Nor is it songs so imbecilic that if you ate a can of Alphabetti Spaghetti you could shit out more intelligent lyrics to a more pleasing tune... It's that... LMFAO understood the pain they would be inflicting on the world and did it anyway."

Some negative feedback have also come in about their rapping and dance beats through the album. Entertainment Weekly gave it a negative review saying "It's topped off by truly terrible rapping, which often turns otherwise groan-inspiring instrumentals into jumbled, maddening filler." The Rolling Stone gave it two stars out of five, positively highlighting that "MC-DJs Redfoo and Sky Blu turn in some skillful hip-hop", but they also said "but also get seriously stupid, rapping about spanking girls and bathing in champagne, over a cheesy pastiche of Eighties synths and pounding beats."

Commercial performance 
Sorry for Party Rocking debuted at number 12 on the US Billboard 200 with 27,100 copies sold in its first week. As of March 2012, the album had sold 808,900 copies in the United States. On the chart dated January 14, 2012 the album archived a peak position of number five on the Billboard 200, making it their first top 10 album in the US.
The album has sold over 1.4 million copies worldwide.

Singles 
 "Party Rock Anthem" was the first single released from the album, released on January 25, 2011. It topped the charts in Australia, Belgium, Canada, France, Denmark, Germany, Ireland, New Zealand, Switzerland, United Kingdom, and the United States. The hit music video for Party Rock Anthem internationally popularized the rave dance "Melbourne Shuffle" which was revamped by David Mues, also known as "Robot Dave". To date, the music video has over 2 billion views on YouTube. It also topped the YouTube 100, along with their later single, "Sexy and I Know It".
 "Champagne Showers" was the second single released from the album, released on May 27, 2011. The single features British singer Natalia Kills. It stands as a top 10 hit in Australia and New Zealand, a top 20 hit in France and Ireland, and a top 40 hit in Belgium (Wallonia), Scotland, and the United Kingdom. The music video is the continuation of "Party Rock Anthem" and currently has more than 250 million views on YouTube and reached #14 on the YouTube 100.
 "Sexy and I Know It" was the third single released from the album, released on September 16, 2011. It topped the charts in Australia, Canada, New Zealand, and the United States. It stands as a top 10 hit in the United Kingdom, Ireland, the Netherlands, Germany, France, Scotland, Denmark, Switzerland, Belgium, Hungary, and Spain. To date, the music video has over 859 million views on YouTube. It also topped the YouTube 100 along with "Party Rock Anthem".
 "Sorry for Party Rocking" is the fourth single from the album, released on January 17, 2012. It stands as a top 10 hit in Belgium, a top 20 hit in France and Ireland, a top 40 hit in the United Kingdom, New Zealand and Australia. It has also charted #19 on the US Pop Songs and #49 in the United States. The music video is a prequel to "Party Rock Anthem" and it debuted on E! on 2/20/12 at 11:30PM ET. It currently has more than 500 million views on YouTube and has reached #3 on the YouTube 100.

Promotional singles 
 "One Day" was released as the album's first promotional single. The song charted at number twenty-two on the UK Dance Charts and 104 on the Singles Chart.

Other charted songs 
 "Rock the Beat II" received strong digital downloads in Portugal and charted at #43.
 "Best Night" received strong digital downloads in Slovakia and charted at #68.

Track listing 

Notes

Sample credits
"Reminds Me of You" samples the song "Awooga" by Calvin Harris
"We Came Here to Party" samples the song "Flashback" by Calvin Harris

Charts

Weekly charts

Year-end charts

Decade-end charts

Certifications

Release history

References

2011 albums
Albums produced by Calvin Harris
LMFAO albums
Interscope Records albums
Interscope Geffen A&M Records albums
≤